SPECOM was the English acronym for Special Commando or  in French, the elite military unit and Special Operations force of the Royal Lao Armed Forces (commonly known by its French acronym FAR), which operated during the final phase of the Laotian Civil War from 1972 to 1975.

Origins
In late 1971 construction began on a training centre at Seno, near Savannakhet, to provide Commando instruction for the Royal Lao Army (RLA) newly formed 2nd Strike Division.  The training cadre, consisting of several Laotian graduates of the U.S. Special Forces (USSF) course at Fort Bragg, North Carolina, in the United States, were converted into the core of an elite Special Commando Company (French: Compagnie Commando Speciale – CCS) or SPECOM for short, directly under the commanding officer of the 2nd Strike Division, Brigadier general Thao Ty. Initial progress was rapid and by mid-1972 SPECOM had expanded from a single understrength company to two airborne reconnaissance (recon) companies; a third was raised in mid-1973 when 140 former para-commandos were transferred from the Savannakhet-based irregular Commando Raider Teams (CRTs) and a heavy weapons company was added, bringing the unit to battalion strength.

Structure and organization
By early 1974, SPECOM strength reached 412 Officers and enlisted men, all airborne-qualified volunteers, organized into a reinforced battalion comprising one headquarters (HQ), four company HQ sections, three recon companies – 1st, 2nd, and 3rd, each broken into 12-men teams – and a heavy weapons company (4th). The unit was headquartered in Seno, near Savannakhet and was subordinated to the 2nd Strike Division until the latter formation's disbandment in April of that same year, when the former was transferred to the RLA Airborne Forces command.

Operational history 1972–75

The missions performed by SPECOM during its brief existence were varied, ranging from long-range strategic and tactical reconnaissance to deep-penetration raids, pathfinding, crash-site recovery, reinforcement and riot control duties. 
The first true combat assignment of the SPECOM occurred in late 1972, when they were used to secure a H-34 helicopter crash site north-east of Seno.  In the opening months of 1973, SPECOM recon teams were sent to Thakhek to bolster its defences when North Vietnamese Army (NVA) units began pressuring the city.  By mid-year elements of the unit were heli-lifted again north-east of Seno to place a listening station near the Ho Chi Minh Trail, the main NVA supply route extended through Laos. A planned SPECOM assault into the national capital Vientiane after renegade Royal Lao Air Force (RLAF) officers led by former Brigadier general Thao Ma captured Wattay Airbase in August was cancelled when their coup attempt quickly fell apart. In April 1974 SPECOM's 2nd recon company was moved to Vientiane to provide VIP security to rightist members of the new coalition government.

Disbandement
In May 1974 the FAR High Command dissolved the ineffective 2nd Strike Division and elements of its three understrength brigades were re-organized into three new parachute battalions ( – BP), the 711er, 712e, and 713e BPs grouped into the RLA's 7th Para Brigade raised at Seno. SPECOM was then converted into the brigade's fourth parachute battalion, 714e BP. 
Elements of 714e BP were deployed in early 1975 to Thakhek to reinforce local Royal Lao Police (PRL) and RLA infantry units in an unsuccessful attempt to quell pro-communist demonstrations.  By May 1975 the 7th Para Brigade was disbanded after Pathet Lao guerrilla forces took control of Vientiane.

Weapons and equipment
The SPECOM used the standard weaponry and equipment of US origin issued to FAR units, complemented by captured Soviet or Chinese small-arms such as AK-47 assault rifles that allowed its personnel to use ammunition retrieved from enemy caches while on operations. The unit also fielded crew-served heavy weapons, such as mortars and recoilless rifles.

 Smith & Wesson Model 10 Revolver
 Colt.45 M1911A1 Pistol 
 Smith & Wesson Model 39 Pistol
 TT-33 Pistol 
 Type 56 assault rifle
 Type 56-1 Assault rifle 
 AKM Assault rifle 
 M16A1 Assault rifle 
 CAR-15 Assault carbine
 RPD Light machine gun
 Type 56 Light machine gun
 M1918A2 BAR Light machine gun 
 M60 Light machine gun
 M72 LAW Anti-tank rocket launcher
 M79 grenade launcher
 XM148 grenade launcher
 M203 grenade launcher 
 Browning M1919A4 .30 Cal Medium machine gun
 Browning M2HB .50 Cal Heavy machine gun 
 M2 4.2 inch mortar 107 mm
 M67 recoilless rifle 90 mm
 M18 Claymore anti-personnel mines

See also
 Army of the Republic of Vietnam Special Forces (LLDB)
 Air America (airline)
 Commando Raider Teams
 Directorate of National Coordination
 Laotian Civil War
 Lao People's Armed Forces
 Khmer Special Forces
 Military Region 5 Commandos
 Pathet Lao
 Royal Lao Armed Forces
 Royal Lao Army Airborne
 Royal Lao Police 
 Special Guerrilla Units (SGU)
 Vietnam War
 Weapons of the Laotian Civil War

Endnotes

References

Kenneth Conboy and Don Greer, War in Laos 1954–1975, Carrollton, TX: Squadron/Signal Publications, 1994. 
Kenneth Conboy and Simon McCouaig, The War in Laos 1960–75, Men-at-arms series 217, Osprey Publishing Ltd, London 1989. 
Kenneth Conboy and Simon McCouaig, South-East Asian Special Forces, Elite series 33, Osprey Publishing Ltd, London 1991. 
Kenneth Conboy with James Morrison, Shadow War: The CIA's Secret War in Laos, Boulder CO: Paladin Press, 1995. , 1581605358

Further reading

Gordon L. Rottman and Ron Volstad, US Army Special Forces 1952–84, Elite series 4, Osprey Publishing Ltd, London 1985. 
Gordon L. Rottman and Kevin Lyles, Green Beret in Vietnam 1957–73, Warrior series 28, Osprey Publishing Ltd, Oxford 2002. 
Khambang Sibounheuang (edited by Edward Y. Hall), White Dragon Two: A Royal Laotian Commando's Escape from Laos, Spartanburg, SC: Honoribus Press, 2002. 

Military units and formations of Laos
Military units and formations established in 1972
Special Forces of Laos
Military units and formations disestablished in 1975
1975 disestablishments